Game for Vultures is a 1979 British thriller film starring Richard Harris, Joan Collins and Richard Roundtree. It was directed by James Fargo and based on a novel by Michael Hartmann set during the Rhodesian Bush War.

Plot
During the late 1970s, as the Rhodesian Bush War reaches its height, arms dealer David Swansey (Richard Harris) is a "sanctions busting" specialist, one of many who keeps the Rhodesian Security Forces supplied through black market purchases despite an extensive international arms embargo. Swansey's latest assignment is to arrange the illicit purchase of military helicopters, which he acquires in the form of surplus Bell UH-1s being auctioned from a United States Air Force base in West Germany. However, word of this transaction is soon leaked to a foreign office of the Zimbabwe African National Union (ZANU), which applies strong political pressure in an attempt to kill the deal in its cradle. Due to this, the helicopters are barred from reaching Rhodesia and instead diverted to neighbouring South West Africa, then administered by South Africa.

Meanwhile, Gideon Marunga (Roundtree) is a guerrilla fighter in the Zimbabwe African National Liberation Army (ZANLA), ZANU's armed wing. Marunga learns that the South African authorities are going to allow Swansey and the Rhodesian Special Air Service to stage a mock raid on the airfield where the helicopters are being stored, with the intention of loading them onto Douglas C-47 Dakotas bound for Rhodesia. On the day of the raid, Marunga arrives at the airfield and stalls the Rhodesian troops, while his accomplices succeed in destroying half of the helicopters. In the ensuing battle he comes face to face with Swansey, and the two men share a weary moment of reflection on their stalemate before abruptly parting ways.

The international fallout from the helicopter affair exposes Swansey's illegal activities and he finds himself unable to continue conducting business outside Rhodesia. He decides to permanently settle there and pursue a normal life, but is immediately conscripted into the security forces. The film closes as Marunga and Swansey confront each other on the battlefield again—this time through the sights of their rifles.

Cast
 Richard Harris as David Swansey
 Richard Roundtree as Gideon Marunga
 Denholm Elliott as Raglan Thistle
 Joan Collins as Nicolle
 Ray Milland as Colonel Brettle
 Sven-Bertil Taube as Larry Prescott 
 Ken Gampu as Sixpence 
 Tony Osoba as Daniel "Danny" Batten 
 Neil Hallett as Tony Knight 
 Mark Singleton as Sir Benjamin Peckover 
 Alibe Parsons as Alice Kamore 
 Victor Melleney as Mallan 
 Jana Cilliers as Ruth Swansey 
 John Parsonson as Peter Swansey 
 Elaine Proctor as Brigid
 Chris Chittell as McAllister
 Graham Armitage as Harken
 Ndaba Mhlongo as Chowa
 Ian Steadman as Du Preez
 Wilson Dunster as Uffa
 Peter van Dissel as Van Rensburg

Production
Game for Vultures was the first British film about the Rhodesian Bush War.

The film was mostly shot in South Africa, near Pretoria and Johannesburg. It was decided not to film in Rhodesia itself because of security concerns and the potential violation of sanctions.

"I'm not a politician", said the producer Hazel Adair. The director James Fargo concurred: "I'm not a political person at all. I never thought about Africa until I started to make a film... The audience will come away with the idea that neither side is right."

"It's a movie in which there are no real bad guys or good guys", said Fargo. "Nobody really wins in the end and everybody loses, like in the real Rhodesia."

During filming in South Africa, Roundtree tried to purchase some alcoholic drinks but was refused service because of his skin colour.

Soundtrack
The music was composed by Tony Duhig and Jon Field, who together comprised the British group Jade Warrior.

Reception
The film was meant to have its world premiere in Johannesburg on 22 June 1979. However the film was banned by South African government censors, who deemed it a threat to state security.

Though generally well-written and produced, Game for Vultures was not a massive commercial or critical success. Some critics condemned the apparent bias of the plot, which ran counter to the traditionally accepted view of Rhodesia's predominantly white government as being a racially oppressive one, while its black nationalist opponents were widely regarded as freedom fighters representing a just cause.

In addition, this film was overtaken by actual events, as the war came to an end before the film reached wide distribution. It saw some success in video sales, on VHS and in a DVD Region 2 release.

Versions, censorship, and home media
The original cinema release of the film was exactly 113 minutes, having been awarded an X certificate by the British Board of Film Censorship. This version was initially released on PAL VHS and Betamax video cassette formats by RCA Columbia in 1986, running to approximately 109 minutes due to PAL speed-up, with an 18 certificate. In 1986 it was cut to approximately 103 minutes for home release (equivalent to around 107m 18s in the cinema) with a 15 certificate. Cuts include an injured soldier being run over by the disabled Land Rover during the early ambush, as well as the scene towards the end in which Danny Batten confronts and stabs his sister, before he himself is killed with a garden fork, which may have been removed to achieve the lower certificate, while other cuts appear to be for other reasons, such as when Raglan Thistle attends a pro-Zimbabwe demonstration in Hyde Park. Subsequent home and VOD releases have been this cut version.

References

External links
 
 

1979 films
1970s war drama films
Films set in 1978
Rhodesian Bush War films
Cold War films
British war drama films
Films directed by James Fargo
Films based on British novels
Films set in Rhodesia
Films set in London
Films set in Namibia
Films set in South Africa
Films about race and ethnicity
Films about racism
Films about communism
1979 drama films
1970s English-language films
1970s British films